These are lists of Indian states and union territories by their nominal gross state domestic product (GSDP). GSDP is the sum of all value added by industries within each state or union territory and serves as a counterpart to the national gross domestic product (GDP).

In India, the Government accounts for around 21% of the GDP, agriculture accounts for 21%, the corporate sector accounts for 12% and the balance 48% of the GDP is sourced from small proprietorship and partnership companies, unorganized sector and households.

The following list gives the latest available gross state domestic product (GSDP) figures for all Indian States and Union Territories at current prices in crores (units of 10 million) or lakh crores (units of 1 trillion) of the Indian rupees. No data is available for the union territories of Dadra and Nagar Haveli and Daman and Diu, Ladakh and Lakshadweep.

List

Nominal GSDP from 2011–12 to 2020–21

The following table shows the annual growth in nominal GSDP for the financial years 2011–12 to 2020–21,  from the Ministry of Statistics and Programme Implementation. Revised data for the past years differ from the tables below. 
Figures are in crores (units of 10 million) of Indian rupees at current prices. No data was available for the union territories of Dadra and Nagar Haveli, Daman and Diu and Lakshadweep.

Nominal GDP from 2001–02 to 2010–11
The following table shows the annual growth in nominal GSDP for the financial years 2001–02 to 2010–11, released by the Planning Commission of India, in the Indian rupees.

Revised data for the past years differ from the tables below.  
Figures are in crores (units of 10 million) of Indian rupees at current prices. No data was available for the union territories of Dadra and Nagar Haveli, Daman and Diu and Lakshadweep.

Nominal GSDP growth rate
This table shows annual growth in each state's nominal GSDP growth in percentage. No data was available for the union territories of Dadra and Nagar Haveli, Daman and Diu and Lakshadweep.

See also
 Economy of India
 Income in India
 Standard of living in India
 Foreign-exchange reserves of India
 Comparison between Indian states and countries by GDP (PPP)
 List of country subdivisions by GDP over 200 billion US dollars
 List of countries by GDP (nominal)

References

External links
 The Economist – comparison of Indian states and territories with countries (2009 data)
 Planning Commission data at constant 2004–05 price archived at 
 Statistics Times – Indian states by GDP

Indian states by economy
GDP
Economy of India lists
Lists of subdivisions of India
India,GDP